The 2013 Shanghai Rolex Masters was a men's tennis tournament played on outdoor hard courts. It was the fifth edition of the Shanghai ATP Masters 1000, classified as an ATP World Tour Masters 1000 event on the 2013 ATP World Tour. It took place at Qizhong Forest Sports City Arena in Shanghai, China from October 6 to October 13, 2013. First-seeded Novak Djokovic won the singles title.

Points and prize money

Point distribution

Prize money

Singles main-draw entrants

Seeds

 1 Rankings are as of September 30, 2013

Other entrants
The following players received wildcards into the singles main draw:
  Gong Maoxin 
  Lleyton Hewitt 
  Wu Di 
  Zhang Ze

The following players received entry from the qualifying draw:
  Alejandro Falla 
  Santiago Giraldo 
  Tatsuma Ito
  Paolo Lorenzi
  Michał Przysiężny
  Michael Russell 
  Go Soeda

Withdrawals
Before the tournament
  Marin Čilić (suspension)
  Nikolay Davydenko
  Ernests Gulbis
  Jerzy Janowicz
  Juan Mónaco
  Andy Murray (back surgery)
During the tournament
  Tommy Haas (back injury)

Retirements
  Tommy Robredo (wrist injury)
  Mikhail Youzhny (stomach pain)

Doubles main-draw entrants

Seeds

 Rankings are as of September 30, 2013

Other entrants
The following pairs received wildcards into the doubles main draw:
  Roger Federer /  Zhang Ze 
  Gong Maoxin /  Li Zhe
The following pairs received entry as alternates:
  Andre Begemann /  Martin Emmrich
  Lukáš Rosol /  Bernard Tomic

Withdrawals
Before the tournament
  Sam Querrey (abdominal injury)
  Tommy Robredo (wrist injury)
During the tournament
  Juan Martín del Potro (fever)

Finals

Singles

  Novak Djokovic defeated  Juan Martín del Potro 6–1, 3–6, 7–6(7–3)

Doubles

  Ivan Dodig /  Marcelo Melo defeated  David Marrero /  Fernando Verdasco 7–6(7–2), 6–7(6–8), [10–2]

External links

Official Website

 
Shanghai ATP Masters 1000
Shanghai Masters (tennis)
Shanghai Rolex Masters
Shanghai Rolex Masters